Dr. Eliza Ritchie (20 May 1856 – 5 September 1933) was a prominent suffragist in Nova Scotia, Canada.

Biography
Ritchie was born on 20 May 1856 in Halifax, Nova Scotia. She was the daughter of John William Ritchie and Amelia Almon.  She attended Dalhousie University and went on to earn her doctorate in German philosophy from Cornell University in 1889, becoming one of the first Canadian women to receive a PhD. She traveled to Leipzig, Germany, and Oxford, England to further her studies. She taught at a variety of universities in the United States before returning to Canada in 1899.

Beginning in 1901 she lectured philosophy at Dalhousie University. She joined her sisters, Ella Almon and Mary Walcot, in social activism in Halifax.  She was on the executive of the Local Council of Women of Halifax, and the Board of the Victoria School of Art. Ritchie worked with Agnes Dennis and Edith Archibald to further the cause of women's suffrage.

Ritchie wrote The Problem of Personality in 1889 and Songs of the Maritimes in 1931.

Ritchie was president of the Dalhousie Alumnae Association. In 1919 was appointed to the Dalhousie Board of Governors, the first woman to serve. In 1927 she received an honorary degree from Dalhousie, the first woman to have that honor.

Ritchie never married. She died on 5 September 1933 in Halifax.

Legacy
Ritchie was the namesake of Dalhousie University residence Eliza Ritchie Hall which was demolished in 2015. She also has a stained glass window in St. Paul's Church (Halifax) dedicated to her and her sisters.

References 

 Judith Fingard. "The Ritchie Sisters and Social Improvement in Early 20th Century Halifax."  Journal of the Royal Nova Scotia Historical Society, Vol. 13, 2010. 1-22

1856 births
1933 deaths
Dalhousie University alumni
Cornell University alumni
Vassar College faculty
Wellesley College faculty
Canadian activists
Canadian suffragists
Canadian women activists